The 1935 Canterbury-Bankstown season was the first in Canterbury's history. The club competed in the New South Wales Rugby Football League Premiership (NSWRFL), finishing 8th for the season.

Ladder

Fixtures

References 

Canterbury-Bankstown Bulldogs seasons